Nitrosomonas is a genus of Gram-negative bacteria, belonging to the Betaproteobacteria. It is one of the five genera of ammonia-oxidizing bacteria and, as an obligate chemolithoautotroph, uses ammonia (NH3) as an energy source and carbon dioxide (CO2) as a carbon source in presence of oxygen. Nitrosomonas are important in the global biogeochemical nitrogen cycle, since they increase the bioavailability of nitrogen to plants and in the denitrification, which is important for the release of nitrous oxide, a powerful greenhouse gas. This microbe is photophobic, and usually generate a biofilm matrix, or form clumps with other microbes, to avoid light. Nitrosomonas can be divided into six lineages: the first one includes the species Nitrosomonas europea, Nitrosomonas eutropha, Nitrosomonas halophila, and Nitrosomonas mobilis. The second lineage presents the species Nitrosomonas communis, N. sp. I and N. sp. II, meanwhile the third lineage includes only Nitrosomonas nitrosa. The fourth lineage includes the species Nitrosomonas ureae and Nitrosomonas oligotropha and the fifth and sixth lineages include the species Nitrosomonas marina, N. sp. III, Nitrosomonas estuarii and Nitrosomonas cryotolerans.

Morphology 
All species included in this genus have ellipsoidal or rod-shaped cells in which are present extensive intracytoplasmic membranes displaying as flattened vesicles.

Most species are motile with a flagellum located in the polar region of the bacillus. Three basic morphological types of Nitrosomonas were studied, which are: short rods Nitrosomonas, rods Nitrosomonas and Nitrosomonas with pointed ends. Nitrosomonas species cells have different criteria of size and shape:

N. europaea shows short rods with pointed ends cells, which size is (0.8-1.1 x 1.0- 1.7) µm; motility has not been observed.

N. eutropha presents rod to pear shaped cells with one or both ends pointed, with a size of (1.0-1.3 x 1.6- 2.3) µm. They show motility.

N. halophila cells have a coccoid shape and a size of (1.1-1.5 x 1.5- 2.2) µm. Motility is possible because of a tuft of flagella.

N. communis shows large rods with rounded ends cells which size is (1.0-1.4 x 1.7- 2.2) µm. Motility has not been observed here.

N. nitrosa, N. oligotropha, and N. ureae cells are spheres or rods with rounded ends. Motility has not been observed in them as well.

N. marina present slender rod cells with rounded ends with a size of (0.7-0.9 x 1.7- 2.2) µm.

N. aestuarii and N. cryotolerans present rod shaped cells.

Genome 
Genome sequencing of Nitrosomonas species has been important to understand the ecological role of these bacteria.

Among the various species of Nitrosomonas that are known today, the complete genomes of N. ureae strain Nm10, and N. europaea, N.sp. Is79 have been sequenced.

Ammonia-oxidation genes

All these species are characterized by the presence of the genes for the ammonia oxidation. The first enzyme involved in the ammonia oxidation is ammonia monooxygenase (AMO), which is encoded by the amoCAB operon. The AMO enzyme catalyzes the oxidation from NH3 (ammonia) to NH2OH (hydroxylamine). The amoCAB operon contains three different genes: amoA, amoB and amoC. While N. europaea presents two copy of the genes, N. sp. Is79 and N. ureae strain Nm10 have three copy of these genes.

The second enzyme involved in the ammonia oxidation is hydroxylamine oxidoreductase (HAO), encoded by the hao operon. This enzyme catalyzes the oxidation from NH2OH  to NO, a highly reactive radical intermediate that can be partitioned into both of the main AOB products: N2O, a potent greenhouse gas, and NO2-, a form of nitrogen more bioavailable for crops, but that conversely washes away from fields faster.  The hao operon contains different genes such as the haoA, that encodes for the functional cytochrome c subunit, the cycA that encodes for cytochrome c554 and the gene cycB that encodes for quinone reductase. These genes are present in different copies in various species; for instance, in Nitrosomonas sp. Is79 there are only three copies, while in N. ureae there are four.

Denitrification genes

Important was the discovery of genes that encodes for enzymes involved in the denitrification. The first gene involved in this process is nirK that encodes for a Nitrite reductase with Copper. This enzyme catalyzes the reduction form NO2(Nitrite) to NO (Nitric oxide). While in N. europaea, N. eutropha and N. cryotolerans nirK is included in a multigenetic cluster, in Nitrosomonas sp. Is79 and N. sp. AL212, it is present as a single gene. A high expression of the nirK gene was found in N.ureae and this has been explained with the hypothesis that the NirK enzyme is also involved in the oxidation of NH2OH in this species. The second genes involved in the denitrification are norCBQD that decode for a nitric-oxide reductase that catalyze the reduction from NO (Nitric oxide) to N2O (NItrous oxide). These genes are present in N. sp. AL212, N.cryotolerans and N. communis strain Nm2. In the Nitrosomonas europaea these genes are included in a cluster. These genes are absent in N. sp. Is79 and N. ureae. Recently is found the norSY gene that encodes for a nitric-oxide reductase with copper in N. communis strain Nm2 and Nitrosomonas AL212.

Carbon fixation genes

Nitrosomonas uses the Calvin-Benson cycle as a pathway for the Carbon fixation. for this reason all the species present an operon that encodes for the RuBisCO enzyme. A peculiarity is found in N. sp Is79 in which the two copy of the operon encode for two different forms of the RuBisCO: the IA form and the IC form, where the first one has major affinity with the Carbon dioxide. Other species present different copies of this operon that encodes only for the IA form. In Nitrosomonas europaea was found an operon characterized by five genes (ccbL, ccbS, ccbQ, ccbO and ccbN)  that encodes for the RuBisCO enzyme. ccbL gene encodes for the major subunit while ccbS encodes for the minor subunit, these genes are also the most expressed. ccbQ and ccbO genes encoding for a number of proteins involved in the mechanisms of processing, folding, assembling, activation and regulation of the RuBisCO, instead ccbN, encodes for a protein of 101 amino acids, whose function is not known yet. Over these genes has been highlighted the presence of an assumed regulatory gene ccbR (transcribed in opposite direction to other genes) placed at 194 bp upstream of the ccbL gene start coding.

Transporter genes

Since Nitrosomonas are part of the AOB, ammonia carriers are important to them. Bacteria adapted to high concentrations of ammonia can absorb it passively by simple diffusion. Indeed, N. eutropha, that is adapted to high level of ammonia doesn't present genes that encodes for ammonia transporter. Bacteria adapted to low concentrations of ammonia, present transporter (transmembrane protein) for this substrate. In Nitrosomonas two different carriers for ammonia have been identified, differing in structure and function. The first transporter is the AMT protein (amtB type) encoded by amt genes and this was found in Nitrosomonas sp. Is79.  The activity of this ammonia carrier depends on the membrane potential. The second was found in Nitrosomonas europaea, where the rh1 gene is present which encodes an Rh-type ammonia carrier. Its activity is independent from the membrane potentia l. Recent research has also linked Rh transmembrane proteins with CO2 transport, but it is not clear yet.

Metabolism 
Nitrosomonas is one of the genera included in the ammonia-oxidizing bacteria (AOB); AOB use ammonia as energy source and carbon dioxide as the main source of carbon. The oxidation of ammonia is a rate-limiting step in nitrification and plays a fundamental role in the nitrogen cycle, because it transforms ammonia, which is usually extremely volatile, into less volatile forms of nitrogen.

Ammonia-oxidation

Nitrosomonas oxidizes ammonia into nitrite in a metabolic process, known as nitritation (a step of nitrification). This process occurs with the accompanying reduction of an oxygen molecule to water (which requires four electrons), and the release of energy. The oxidation of ammonia to hydroxylamine is catalyzed by ammonia monooxygenase (AMO), which is a membrane-bound, multisubstrate enzyme. In this reaction two electrons are required to reduce an oxygen atom to water:

NH3 + O2 + 2 H+ + 2 e– → NH2OH + H2O 

Since an ammonia molecule only releases two electrons when oxidized, it has been assumed that the other two necessary electrons come from the oxidation of hydroxylamine to nitrite, which occurs in the periplasm and it is catalyzed by hydroxylamine oxidoreductase (HAO), a periplasm associated enzymes.

NH2OH + H2O → NO2– + 5 H+ + 4 e–  

Two of the four electrons released by the reaction, return to the AMO to convert the ammonia in hydroxylamine. 1,65 of the two remaining electrons are available for the assimilation of nutrients and the generation of the proton gradient. They pass through the cytochrom c552 to the cytochrome caa3, then to O2, which is the terminal acceptor; here they are reduced to form water. The remaining 0,35 electrons are used to reduce NAD+ to NADH, to generate the proton gradient.

Nitrite is the major nitrogen oxide produced in the process, but it has been observed that, when oxygen concentrations are low, nitrous oxide and nitric oxide can also form, as by-products from the oxidation of hydroxylamine to nitrite.

The species N.europaea has been identified as being able to degrade a variety of halogenated compounds including trichloroethylene, benzene, and vinyl chloride.

Ecology

Habitat

Some species can live and proliferate on monuments’ surface or on stone buildings’ walls, contributing to erosion of those surfaces.

It is usually found in all types of waters, globally distributed in both eutrophic and oligotrophic freshwater and saltwater, emerging especially above all in shallow coastal sediments and under the upwelling zones, such as the Peruvian coast and the Arabian Sea,  but can also find in fertilized soils.

Some Nitrosomonas species, such as N.europaea, possess the enzyme urease (which catalyzes the conversion of the urea into ammonia and carbon dioxide) and have been shown to assimilate the carbon dioxide released by the reaction to make biomass via the Calvin cycle, and harvest energy by oxidizing ammonia (the other product of urease) to nitrite. This feature may explain enhanced growth of AOB in the presence of urea in acidic environments.

Leaching of soil

In agriculture, nitrification made by Nitrosomonas represents a problem because the oxidized nitrite by ammonia can persist in the soil, leaching, and making it less available for plants.

Nitrification can be slowed down by some inhibitors that are able to slow down the oxidation process of ammonia to nitrites by inhibiting the activity of bacteria of the genus Nitrosomonas and other ammonia-oxidizing bacteria, minimize or prevent the loss of nitrate. (Read more about inhibitors in the section 'Inhibitors of nitrification' on this page Nitrification)

Application

Nitrosomonas is used in activated sludge in aerobic wastewater treatment; the reduction of nitrogen compounds in the water is given by nitrification treatment in order to avoid environmental issues, such as ammonia toxicity and groundwater contamination. Nitrogen, if present in high quantities can cause algal development, leading to eutrophication with degradation of oceans and lakes.

Employing as wastewater treatment biological removal of nitrogen is obtained a lower economic expense and less damage caused to the environment compared to physical-chemical treatments.

Nitrosomonas has also a role in biofilter systems, typically in association and collaboration with other microbes, to consume compounds such as NH4+ or CO2  and recycle nutrients. These systems are used for various purposes but mainly for the elimination of odors from waste treatment.

Other uses

Potential cosmetic benefits

N. europaea is a non-pathogenic bacteria which has been studied in connection with probiotic therapies, in which context it may give aesthetic benefits in terms of reducing the appearance of wrinkles. The effectiveness of probiotic products has been studied to explore why N. eutropha, which is a highly mobile bacterium, has become extinct from the normal flora of our skin. It has been studied in connection with the idea of having benefits through the repopulation and reintroduction of N. eutropha to the normal flora of human skin.

See also
 Nitrate
 Nitrite
 Nitrobacter
 Nitrobacteraceae
 Nitrogen cycle
 Nitrospira
 Nitrospirota

References

 George M. Garrity: Bergey's manual of systematic bacteriology. 2. Auflage. Springer, New York, 2005, Vol. 2: The Proteobacteria Part C: The Alpha-, Beta-, Delta-, and Epsilonproteobacteria 
 Winogradsky, S. 1892. Contributions à la morphologie des organismes de la nitrification. Archives des Sciences Biologiques (St. Petersbourg). 1:86-137.

Soil biology
Nitrosomonadaceae
Bacteria genera